Therates is a genus of beetles in the family Cicindelidae, containing the following species:

 Therates alboobliquatus W.Horn, 1909
 Therates angustatus W.Horn, 1902
 Therates annandalei W.Horn, 1908
 Therates apiceflavus Sawada & Wiesner, 1999
 Therates apicenigrus Sawada & Wiesner, 1999
 Therates bannapecolus Sawada & Wiesner, 1999
 Therates bannokcolus Sawada & Wiesner, 1999
 Therates basalis Dejean, 1826
 Therates batesii J.Thomson, 1857
 Therates belokobylskiyi Matalin & Wiesner, 2006
 Therates bipunctatus Wiesner, 1988
 Therates biserratus Tan Juanjie et al., 1991
 Therates bryanti W.Horn, 1922
 Therates caligatus Bates, 1872
 Therates cheesmanae Wiesner, 1988
 Therates chennelli Bates, 1878
 Therates circumscriptus J.Moravec & Wiesner, 1999
 Therates clavicornis W.Horn, 1902
 Therates coeruleus Dejean, 1822
 Therates concinnus Gestro, 1888
 Therates confluens Wiesner, 1988
 Therates coracinus Erichson, 1834
 Therates crebrepunctatus W.Horn, 1923
 Therates cribratus Fleutiaux, 1893
 Therates csorbai Wiesner, 1999
 Therates cyaneus Chaudoir, 1861
 Therates dembickyi Sawada & Wiesner, 2002
 Therates dichromus J.Thomson, 1859
 Therates differens Sawada & Wiesner, 1999
 Therates dimidiatus Dejean, 1825
 Therates dohertyi W.Horn, 1905
 Therates erinnys Bates, 1874
 Therates fasciatus (Fabricius, 1801)
 Therates festivus Boisduval, 1835
 Therates flavilabris (Fabricius, 1801)
 Therates flavispinus Brouerius van Nidek, 1957
 Therates fleutiauxi W.Horn, 1898
 Therates fruhstorferi W.Horn, 1902
 Therates fulvicollis J.Thomson, 1860
 Therates fulvipennis Chaudoir, 1848
 Therates gestroi W.Horn, 1900
 Therates haucki J.Moravec & Wiesner, 2001
 Therates hennigi W.Horn, 1898
 Therates hiermeieri Werner, 1991
 Therates jendeki Sawada & Wiesner, 1997
 Therates kaliakini Matalin & Wiesner, 2006
 Therates klapperichi Mandl, 1955
 Therates kraatzi W.Horn, 1900
 Therates labiatus (Fabricius, 1801)
 Therates laotiensis Sawada & Wiesner, 1999
 Therates latreillei J.Thomson, 1860
 Therates maindroni W.Horn, 1900
 Therates major Probst & Wiesner, 1994
 Therates mandli Probst, 1986
 Therates merkli Wiesner, 1996
 Therates miyamai Sawada & Wiesner, 2000
 Therates montaneus Werner, 1992
 Therates moraveci Sawada & Wiesner, 1999
 Therates murzini Wiesner, 1999
 Therates myanmarensis Wiesner, 1999
 Therates nagaii Sawada & Wiesner, 2000
 Therates naidenowi Wiesner, 1996
 Therates namthacolus Sawada & Wiesner, 1999
 Therates nepelensis Probst & Wiesner, 1994
 Therates nigromarginalis Probst & Wiesner, 1994
 Therates obliquefasciatus W.Horn, 1912
 Therates obliquus Fleutlaux, 1893
 Therates ottomerkli Wiesner, 1999
 Therates palawanensis Bogenberger, 1988
 Therates payeni Linden, 1829
 Therates princeps Bates, 1878
 Therates probsti Wiesner, 1988
 Therates pseudochenelli Probst & Wiesner, 1994
 Therates pseudoconfluens Sawada & Wiesner, 1999
 Therates pseudomandli Probst & Wiesner, 1996
 Therates pseudoprobsti Probst & Wiesner, 1994
 Therates pseudorothschildi Mandl, & Pearson, 1978
 Therates pseudorugifer Sawada & Wiesner, 1999
 Therates pseudosemperi W.Horn, 1928
 Therates punctatoviridis W.Horn, 1933
 Therates rennellensis Brouerius van Nidek, 1968
 Therates riedeli Werner, 1991
 Therates rihai J.Moravec & Wiesner, 200 1
 Therates rogerl Probst & Wiesner, 1994
 Therates rothschildi W.Horn, 1896
 Therates rugifer W.Horn, 1902
 Therates rugosoangustatus W.Horn, 1929
 Therates rugulosus W.Horn, 1900
 Therates sausai Sawada & Wiesner, 1997
 Therates schaumianus W.Horn, 1905
 Therates semperi Schaum 1860
 Therates similis Probst & Wiesner, 1994
 Therates spectabilis Schaum, 1863
 Therates spinipennis Dejean, 1822
 Therates tonkinensis W.Horn, 1902
 Therates topali Mandl, 1972
 Therates tuberosus Fleutiaux, 1893
 Therates vietnamensis Wiesner, 1988
 Therates waagenorum W.Horn, 1900
 Therates wegneri Brouerius van Niedek, 1957
 Therates westbengalensis Wiesner, 1996
 Therates whiteheadi Bates, 1889
 Therates wiesneri Cassola, 1991
 Therates yamaokai Sawada & Wiesner, 2000

References

 
Cicindelidae